Justin K. Price (born December 29, 1964) is an American politician and is the Republican member of the Rhode Island House of Representatives representing District 39, which includes Exeter, Hopkinton, and Richmond, Rhode Island. Price took office in January 2015. He lost reelection to the House in 2022, to Democrat Megan Cotter by 32 votes after a recount.

Price serves on the Municipal Government and Housing, Small Business, Special Legislation, and Veterans' Affairs committees. Price is also the co-chairman of the Republican Policy Group.

Several Rhode Island Democrats, including Seth Magaziner, called for Price to resign after Price's refusal to wear a mask at the 2021 legislative swearing in (during the COVID-19 pandemic), and his amplification of conspiracy theories regarding the 2021 United States Capitol attack. Price claims he peacefully marched to the Capitol and that Antifa was responsible for a false flag.

References

External links
Official page at the Rhode Island General Assembly
Campaign Website
Justin Price at Ballotpedia
Votesmart

Republican Party members of the Rhode Island House of Representatives
Protesters in or near the January 6 United States Capitol attack
Living people
1964 births
21st-century American politicians